Hugus is a hamlet in west Cornwall, England, United Kingdom. It is three miles (5 km) west of Truro. It is in the civil parish of Kea

References

Hamlets in Cornwall